is a passenger railway station located in the city Tachikawa, Tokyo, Japan, operated by the private railway operator Seibu Railway.

Lines
Seibu-Tachikawa Station is served by the Seibu Haijima Line, and is located 11.6 kilometers from the starting point of that line at Kodaira Station.

Station layout
This station consists of a single ground-level island platform serving two tracks, with an elevated station building located above and perpendicular to the tracks.

History
Seibu-Tachikawa Station opened on 5 May 1968.

Station numbering was introduced on all Seibu Railway lines during fiscal 2012, with Seibu-Tachikawa Station becoming "SS35".

Passenger statistics
In fiscal 2019, the station was the 66th busiest on the Seibu network with an average of 11,705 passengers daily. 

The passenger figures for previous years are as shown below.

Surrounding area
Tamagawa Aqueduct

See also
List of railway stations in Japan

References

External links

 Seibu-Tachikawa Station information (Seibu Railway) 

Railway stations in Tokyo
Stations of Seibu Railway
Railway stations in Japan opened in 1968
Seibu Haijima Line
Tachikawa, Tokyo